Władysław Tatarkiewicz (3 April 1886, Warsaw – 4 April 1980, Warsaw) was a Polish philosopher, historian of philosophy, historian of art, esthetician, and ethicist.

Early life and education
Tatarkiewicz began his higher education at Warsaw University. When it was closed by the Russian Imperial authorities in 1905, he was forced to continue his education abroad in Marburg, Germany, where he studied from 1907 to 1910.

Career
As he describes in his Memoirs, it was a chance encounter with a male relative, whose height made him stand out above the crowd at a Kraków railroad station, upon the outbreak of World War I that led Tatarkiewicz to spend the war years in Warsaw. There he began his career as a lecturer in philosophy, teaching at a girls' school on Mokotowska Street, across the street from where Józef Piłsudski was to reside during his first days after World War I.

During World War I, when the Polish University of Warsaw was opened under the sponsorship of the occupying Germans – who wanted to win Polish support for their war effort – Tatarkiewicz directed its philosophy department in 1915–19.

In 1919–21 he was professor at Stefan Batory University in Wilno, in 1921–23 at the University of Poznań, and in 1923–61 again at the University of Warsaw. In 1930 he became a member of the Polish Academy of Sciences.

During World War II, risking his life, he conducted underground lectures in German-occupied Warsaw (one of the audience members was Czesław Miłosz). After the suppression of the Warsaw Uprising (August–October 1944) he again consciously risked his life when retrieving a manuscript from the gutter, where a German soldier had hurled it (this and other materials were later published as a book, in English translation titled Analysis of Happiness).

After World War II, he taught at the University of Warsaw. In March 1950 Tatarkiewicz was demoted and banned from teaching after seven of his students (including Henryk Holland and Leszek Kołakowski), who were activists in the Polish United Workers' Party, presented a "Letter of 7" which denounced him for "privileging 'objective-bourgois' science instead of Marxist engagement" and opposing "the construction of socialism in Poland".

Władysław Tatarkiewicz died the day after his 94th birthday. In his Memoirs, published shortly before, he recalled having been ousted from his University chair (by Henryk Holland, a politically connected former student). Characteristically, he saw even that indignity as a blessing in disguise, as it gave him freedom from academic duties, and leisure to pursue research and writing.

Tatarkiewicz reflected that at all crucial junctures of his life, he had failed to foresee events, many of them tragic, but that this had probably been for the better, since he could not have altered them anyway.

View on happiness
Tatarkiewicz believed that "satisfaction with particular things... is only partial satisfaction; happiness requires total satisfaction, that is, satisfaction with life as a whole."

Major works 
Tatarkiewicz belonged to the interwar Lwów–Warsaw school of logic, created by Kazimierz Twardowski, which gave reborn Poland many scholars and scientists:  philosophers, logicians, psychologists, sociologists, and organizers of academia.

Tatarkiewicz educated generations of Polish philosophers, estheticians and art historians, as well as a multitude of interested laymen. He posthumously continues to do so through his History of Philosophy and numerous other works.

In his final years, Tatarkiewicz devoted considerable attention to securing translations of his major works.  Of the below incomplete listing of his works, his 1909 German-language doctoral thesis, and his History of Philosophy, Łazienki warszawskie, Parerga, and Memoirs have not been translated into English.

 Die Disposition der aristotelischen Principien (German: Aristotle's System of Concepts):  Tatarkiewicz's 1909 doctoral thesis, published 1910. First Polish-language edition:  Układ pojęć w filozofii Arystotelesa (The System of Concepts in Aristotle's Philosophy), translated from the German by Izydora Dąmbska, Warsaw, Państwowe Wydawnictwo Naukowe, 1978, 126 pp.
 History of Philosophy, three volumes  (vols. 1-2, 8th ed. 1978; vol. 3, 5th ed. 1978).
 History of Aesthetics, three volumes (vols. 1-2, 1970; vol. 3, 1974). (vols. 1-2, 1962; vol. 3, 1967.)
 Analysis of Happiness, 1976, . ( [On Happiness], 1962; 7th ed., 1979, .)
 Łazienki warszawskie (Warsaw's Royal Baths Park), with photographs by Edmund Kupiecki, Warsaw, Wydawnictwo Arkady, 1968, 299 pp.  A study of the aesthetics of what Tatarkiewicz identified as the "style of [Poland's last king] Stanisław August", as manifested in the structures and grounds of Warsaw's Royal Baths Park.
 A History of Six [aesthetic] Ideas, 1980, . (2nd ed. 1976.)
 Parerga (By-Works), Warsaw, Państwowe Wydawnictwo Naukowe, 1978, 141 pp. Polish language. Chapters:
"Two Concepts of Beauty"
"Two Concepts of Poetry"
"Creation and Discovery"
"The Concept of Value"
"Civilization and Culture"
"Art and Technology"
"Integration of the Arts"
"Photographs and Pictures"
"Tragedy and the Tragic"
"The Great and the Close"
 On Perfection (1976).  English translation by Christopher Kasparek was serialized in Dialectics and Humanism:  the Polish Philosophical Quarterly, vol. VI, no. 4 [autumn 1979] — vol. VIII, no. 2 [spring 1981].  Kasparek's translation has subsequently also appeared in the book:  Władysław Tatarkiewicz, On perfection, Warsaw University Press, Center of Universalism, 1992, pp. 9–51; the book is a collection of papers by and about the late Professor Tatarkiewicz.
 Memoirs (1979).

See also
 History of philosophy in Poland
 History of the concept of creativity
 List of Poles
 Perfection

Notes

References
 Teresa i [i.e., "and"] Władysław Tatarkiewiczowie [i.e., "Tatarkiewicz"], Wspomnienia (Memoirs), Warsaw, Państwowy Instytut Wydawniczy, 1979, .
 Władysław Tatarkiewicz, Analysis of Happiness, Warsaw, PWN, The Hague, Martinus Nijhoff, 1976, .
 Marek Jaworski, Władysław Tatarkiewicz, Warsaw, Interpress, 1975.
 Władysław Tatarkiewicz, Zarys dziejów filozofii w Polsce (A Brief History of Philosophy in Poland), [in the series:]  Historia nauki polskiej w monografiach (History of Polish Learning in Monographs), [volume] XXXII, Kraków, Polska Akademia Umiejętności (Polish Academy of Learning), 1948.  This monograph draws from pertinent sections in earlier editions of the author's Historia filozofii (History of Philosophy).
 "Władysław Tatarkiewicz," Encyklopedia Polski (Encyclopedia of Poland), Kraków, Kluszczyński, 1996, p. 686.
 "Władysław Tatarkiewicz," Encyklopedia powszechna PWN (PWN Universal Encyclopedia), vol. 4, Warsaw, Państwowe Wydawnictwo Naukowe, 1976.

External links 
 Polish philosophy page: Władysław Tatarkiewicz

1886 births
1980 deaths
Polish male writers
People from Warsaw Governorate
20th-century Polish philosophers
Polish historians of philosophy
Polish ethicists
Polish art historians
Academic staff of the University of Warsaw
Academic staff of Vilnius University
Members of the Polish Academy of Sciences